Young Arthur is a 2002 NBC TV drama about the childhood of King Arthur directed by Mikael Salomon and written by Remi Aubuchon and Graham Yost. Filming occurred in Prague.

Cast
Julian Morris - Arthur
James Fleet - Merlin
Paul Wesley (as Paul Wasilewski) - Lancelot
James Hoare - Kay
Jo Stone-Fewings - Jack
Stephen Billington - Lord Vortigen
Laura Rees - Morgana
David Birkin - Mordred
Desmond Barrit - Bullwhit
Marc Small - Heflin
Tony Maudsley - Aloysius
Clive Swift - Illtud
Nick Brimble - Pelinore
Patrick Gordon - Grimthorpe
Christian Burgess - Ector

External links

2002 television films
2002 films
American drama television films
Films directed by Mikael Salomon
Television pilots not picked up as a series
Films shot in the Czech Republic
Arthurian films
2000s English-language films